The Highbinders is a 1926 American silent drama film directed by George Terwilliger and starring  Marjorie Daw, Ben Alexander and George Hackathorne.

Cast
 Walter T. Tilden as 	David Marshall
 Marjorie Daw as Hope Masterson
 Ben Alexander as Roy Marshall
 George Hackathorne as 	Humpty Dugan
 Edmund Breese as Mike Harrigan
 Walter Long as Bill Dorgan
 George F. Marion as Wadsworth Ladd
 Effie Shannon as 	Mrs. James Cortright
 Hugh Thompson as Arnold Blair
 Tammany Young as Stump Rogers
 Hattie Delaro as Mrs. Briggs
 Kathleen Martyn as Alice Van Slake

References

Bibliography
 Munden, Kenneth White. The American Film Institute Catalog of Motion Pictures Produced in the United States, Part 1. University of California Press, 1997.

External links

1926 films
1926 drama films
American black-and-white films
American silent feature films
Films directed by George Terwilliger
Associated Exhibitors films
1920s English-language films
1920s American films
Silent American drama films
Silent adventure films